Paloma Picasso (born Anne Paloma Ruiz-Picasso y Gilot on 19 April 1949) is a French and Spanish fashion designer and businesswoman, best known for her jewelry designs for Tiffany & Co, and her signature perfumes. She is the daughter of artist Pablo Picasso and painter Françoise Gilot.

Paloma Picasso is represented in many of her father's works, such as Paloma with an Orange and Paloma in Blue.

Career

Paloma Picasso's jewelry career began in 1968, when she was a costume designer in Paris. Some rhinestone necklaces she had created from stones purchased at flea markets drew attention from critics. Encouraged by this early success, the designer pursued formal schooling in jewelry design. A year later, Ms. Picasso presented her first efforts to her friend, famed couturier Yves Saint Laurent, who immediately commissioned her to design accessories to accompany one of his collections. By 1971, she was working for the Greek jewelry company Zolotas.

In 1980 Picasso began designing jewelry for Tiffany & Co. of New York. In 1984 she began experimenting with fragrance, creating the "Paloma" perfume for L'Oréal. In the New York Post Picasso described it as intended for "strong women like herself." A cosmetics and bath line including body lotion, powder, shower gel, and soap were produced in the same year.

Two American museums have acquired Ms. Picasso's work for their permanent collections. Housed in the Smithsonian Institution's National Museum of Natural History is a 396.30-carat kunzite necklace designed by her. And visitors to The Field Museum of Natural History in Chicago can view her 408.63-carat moonstone bracelet accented with diamond "lightning bolts."

In 1988, Ms. Picasso was honored by The Fashion Group as one of the "Women Who Have Made an Extraordinary Impact on Our Industry." The Hispanic Designers Inc. presented her with its MODA award for design excellence. Since 1983, she has been a member of the International Best Dressed List.

In 2010, Picasso celebrated her 30th anniversary with Tiffany and Co. by introducing a collection based upon her love of Morocco, called Marrakesh.  In 2011, she debuted her Venezia collection, which celebrates the city of Venice and its motifs.

Red
Picasso has a penchant for red; her red lipsticks were called "her calling cards". François Nars says about Paloma, "red is her trademark." "It's her signature, defining, one might say, the designer's red period."

Her fascination with red started at an early age, when she began wearing bright red lipstick at age 6. She has become recognizable by her red lipstick; "Her angular profile serves as a reminder of her father's Cubist inclinations." When she feels like staying incognito, she simply avoids wearing her red lipstick: "Red lips have become my signature, so when I don’t want to be recognized, I don’t wear it."

Film
Picasso briefly lost interest in designing following the death of her father in 1973, at which time she played Countess Erzsébet Báthory in Polish filmmaker Walerian Borowczyk's erotic film, Immoral Tales (1973), receiving praise from the critics for her beauty. She has not acted since.

Personal life
In 1978, Picasso married playwright and director Rafael Lopez-Cambil (also known as Rafael Lopez-Sanchez) in a black-and-white themed wedding. The couple later divorced. In 1999, Picasso married Dr. Eric Thévenet, a Doctor of Osteopathic Medicine. Thévenet's interest in art and design provided valuable encouragement for the creation of Picasso's jewelry collections. Paloma Picasso and her husband live in Lausanne, Switzerland and in Marrakech, Morocco.

Paloma Picasso's older brother is Claude Picasso (b. 1947), her half-brother is Paulo Picasso (1921–1975), her half-sister is Maya (1935-2022), and she has another half-sister, Aurelia (b. 1956), from her mother's marriage to artist Luc Simon.

References

External links

 

1949 births
French jewellery designers
Living people
French people of Spanish descent
French fashion designers
Tiffany & Co.
Women metalsmiths
People from Lausanne
People from Marrakesh
French expatriates in Spain
French expatriates in Switzerland
French expatriates in Morocco
Pablo Picasso
French women fashion designers
Spanish women fashion designers
Women jewellers